Idols of Clay is a 1920 American silent drama film directed by George Fitzmaurice and starring Mae Murray and David Powell. A copy of the film survives in the Gosfilmofond Archive in Moscow.

Cast
 Mae Murray - Faith Merrill
 David Powell - Dion Holme
 Dorothy Cumming - Lady Cray
 George Fawcett - Jim Merrill
 Leslie King - Blinky
 Richard Wangermann - Old Master
 Claude King - Dr. Herbert

References

External links

 
 
Idols of Clay at silenthollywood.com

1920 films
1920 drama films
Silent American drama films
American silent feature films
American black-and-white films
Famous Players-Lasky films
Films directed by George Fitzmaurice
Paramount Pictures films
Films with screenplays by Ouida Bergère
1920s American films